Beaucarnea purpusii is a tree in the family Asparagaceae, native to Mexico.

Distribution and habitat
Beaucarnea purpusii is endemic to Mexico, where it is confined to the Tehuacán-Cuicatlán Biosphere Reserve in Puebla and Oaxaca.

Conservation
Beaucarnea purpusii has been assessed as endangered on the IUCN Red List. It is primarily threatened by illegal harvesting for the ornamental plant trade. It is also threatened by conversion of its habitat for agriculture and urban development. Fires in its habitat occur with increasing frequency and intensity.

References

purpusii
Endemic flora of Mexico
Flora of Puebla
Flora of Oaxaca
Plants described in 1906
Taxa named by Joseph Nelson Rose